Temnora zantus is a moth of the family Sphingidae. It is known from forests in Congo and Uganda.

It is superficially similar to Temnora atrofasciata, but the forewing outer margin is crenulated and the forewing upperside has a pale apical area separated from the dark brown median area by a distinct narrow white line and beyond which is a line of dark brown spots. The forewing inner margin is deeply concave before the tornus. The abdominal tergites have a white dot on the lower edges. The abdominal sternites have two rows of blackish spots.

Subspecies
Temnora zantus zantus (South Africa)
Temnora zantus apiciplaga (Karsch, 1891) (Cameroon to Uganda and western Kenya)
Temnora zantus curvilimes Hering, 1927 (forest and woodland from Zimbabwe and Mozambique to Malawi, Tanzania and the coast of Kenya)

References

Temnora
Moths described in 1854
Moths of Africa